This article gives statistics of the Latvian Higher League in association football in the 1974 season.

Overview
It was contested by 12 teams, and VEF won the championship.

League standings

Playoff
VEF 9-1 Elektrons

References
 RSSSF

Latvian SSR Higher League
Football 
Latvia